Agargaon metro station (romanised: Agarg(n)ao metro steshen)is a metro station of the Dhaka Metro's MRT Line 6. It is located in Agargaon, and was opened on 28 December 2022

History
The Agargaon Metro Station was constructed under "Package CP-03". The notification of application for construction of raised bridges for stations and railways was published on 30 June 2015 and the last date for submission of applications was 9 September 2015. Italian-Thai Development Public Company Limited gets work contract for "Package CP-03". The agreement document was sent to the ministry on 29 March 2016 for NBR investigation and law and parliamentary investigation. The signing ceremony for the agreement package was held on 3 May 2017 at the Pan Pacific Sonargaon Hotel in Dhaka. Construction work started on 2 August 2017. It was inaugurated on 29 December 2022 and opened on the next day.

Station

Station layout

Connectivity
Bangladesh Road Transport Corporation provides shuttle bus service from the station to Motijheel via Farmgate and Shahbag.

References

External links

Dhaka Metro stations
Railway stations opened in 2022
2022 establishments in Bangladesh